Vassalo is a surname. Notable people with the surname include:

Manuel António Vassalo e Silva (1899–1985), Portuguese military officer, administrator, and governor-general
Maria Lúcia Vassalo Namorado (1909–2000), Portuguese writer, poet, journalist, teacher, and social reformer
Salvador Vassalo (born 1993), Portuguese rugby union player

See also
Vassallo
Vasallo